Usa River or Usaa River is a town and ward around  to the east of the City of Arusha, the capital of the Arusha Region of northern Tanzania. Usa River is the district capital of Meru District. As of 2012, Usa River ward had a population of 23,437.

Education 

Tumaini University Makumira, formerly Lutheran Theological College Makumira, is the main campus of Tumaini University, the university of the Evangelical Lutheran Church in Tanzania, established in 1997.

The MS Training Centre for Development Cooperation is located in Usa River.

The School of St Jude, a charity-funded school for the poorest children of the Arusha Region, has a campus in Usa River.
The Usa River Rehabilitation Center is a Lutheran center in Usa River where also people with disabilities are trained in various vocations. The center also runs a bakery where a wide range of breads and cakes are produced and sold at a stall near the Moshi-Arusha Road. 

Kennedy House International School, is a British curriculum Primary School opened in 2010. It serves both the local and expat community of Arusha and Usa River.

References

Wards of Meru District
Wards of Arusha Region